Montoro Superiore was a town and former comune (municipality) in the province of Avellino, Campania, Italy.
 
Following a referendum, the municipality was officially disestablished on 3 December 2013; after being merged, with Montoro Inferiore, in the new municipality of Montoro.

People
Giuseppe De Falco (1908-1955), politician

See also
Montoro, Campania
Montoro Inferiore

References
 

Former municipalities of Campania
Montoro, Campania